Neal Byrne (born 15 June 1976) is an Irish rower. He competed in the men's lightweight coxless four event at the 2000 Summer Olympics.

References

External links
 

1976 births
Living people
Irish male rowers
Olympic rowers of Ireland
Rowers at the 2000 Summer Olympics
Sportspeople from Dublin (city)